The 1941 Dayton Flyers football team was an American football team that represented the University of Dayton as an independent during the 1941 college football season. In their 19th season under head coach Harry Baujan, the Flyers compiled a 7–3 record and outscored opponents by a total of 224 to 60.

Beno Keiter was the team captain. Key players also included halfbacks Joe Quinn and Bill Knisley.

Schedule

References

Dayton
Dayton Flyers football seasons
Dayton Flyers football